Trevor Martin Smith is a former English competitive swimmer who represented Great Britain in two Olympic Games (Montreal 1976 & Moscow 1980), FINA world championships (1978) and European championships (1977), and swam for England in the 1978 Commonwealth Games.  Smith was an Olympic bronze medallist and won six medals in major international swimming championships as a member of British or English teams. He also played American football - Place Kicker while a student-athlete at the University of Arkansas.

Swimming
Smith represented Great Britain at the 1976 and 1980 Olympic Games. He was part of the bronze medal winning team in the men's 4×100-metre medley relay alongside teammates Gary Abraham, Duncan Goodhew and David Lowe.
Smith also represented Great Britain winning a bronze medal at the 1978 World championships (Berlin) and a bronze medal at the 1977 European Championships in Sweden.
He represented England and won a silver medal in the 4×100 metres medley relay and two bronze medals in the freestyle relays, at the 1978 Commonwealth Games in Edmonton, Alberta, Canada. He is also a two times winner of the ASA National Championship 100 metres freestyle (1977 and 1980).

Smith joined the swimming team at the University of Arkansas where he became a 3 time All American, and later becoming their head coach until the team was discontinued in 1996. That same year, he was inducted into the Arkansas Swimming Hall of Fame. In 2019, Smith was inducted into the University of Arkansas Sports Hall of Honor for his achievements as a Razorback swimmer and football player.

American football
After his collegiate swimming eligibility was exhausted, Smith walked on to the Arkansas Razorbacks football team at the University of Arkansas.  A barefoot placekicker, he was successful on 22 of 22 point after touchdown attempts and 5 of 7 field goals in the 1982 campaign, his only season. He was locked in a kicking competition at the beginning of the season, finally satisfying head coach Lou Holtz.  Smith played in the 1982 Bluebonnet Bowl, where he kicked four extra points in Arkansas' 28-to-24 victory over the Florida Gators.

Family
Smith is from a sporting family. His brother Neil Smith was an international water polo player representing England and Great Britain on the Under 21 years teams, represented Great Britain at the World Life Saving Championships in Berlin in 1978, and British Police and England in the 1974 European Wrestling championships where he won a bronze medal.

See also
 List of Commonwealth Games medallists in swimming (men)
 List of Olympic medalists in swimming (men)

References

External links
British Olympic Association athlete profile
Sports-Reference.com athlete profile

1958 births
Living people
English male freestyle swimmers
Olympic swimmers of Great Britain
Swimmers at the 1976 Summer Olympics
Swimmers at the 1980 Summer Olympics
Olympic bronze medallists for Great Britain
Swimmers at the 1978 Commonwealth Games
Commonwealth Games silver medallists for England
Commonwealth Games bronze medallists for England
Arkansas Razorbacks football players
Arkansas Razorbacks men's swimmers
English players of American football
Olympic bronze medalists in swimming
World Aquatics Championships medalists in swimming
European Aquatics Championships medalists in swimming
Medalists at the 1980 Summer Olympics
Commonwealth Games medallists in swimming
Medallists at the 1978 Commonwealth Games